Biwi is a populated place in Lilongwe District, Central Region, Malawi. Biwi is 31 km (19 mi) away from the capital of the district, region, and country of Lilongwe.

Geography 
Nearby places of Biwi are: Bisai, Khombe, Mkwela, Mkwiche, and Mpango

Ref 

Populated places in Central Region, Malawi